The Andrew Johnson National Cemetery is a United States National Cemetery on the grounds of the Andrew Johnson National Historic Site in Greeneville, Tennessee. Established in 1906, the cemetery was built around the resting place of Andrew Johnson, the 17th President of the United States, and holds more than two thousand graves.

Andrew Johnson acquired twenty-three acres outside Greeneville on "Signal Hill" in 1852. It is held by family tradition that Andrew Johnson greatly enjoyed the view the hill provided. It became known as Signal Hill due to being an excellent place for soldiers to signal to friendly forces. When Johnson died, he was buried on the property on August 3, 1875. The funeral was performed by Freemasons. The monument was considered so dominant that the hill's name was changed to "Monument Hill". His daughter Martha Johnson Patterson willed on September 2, 1898, that the land become a park. She further pushed in 1900 to make the site a national cemetery, so that instead of the Johnson family maintaining it, the federal government would. The United States Congress chose to make the site a National Cemetery in 1906, and by 1908 the United States War Department took control of it. By 1939 there were 100 total graves in the cemetery. On May 23, 1942, control of the cemetery went to the National Park Service.

When the area was made a cemetery, two of Andrew Johnson's sons were reinterred. Charles Johnson had been buried in Nashville, Tennessee; he died in 1863 by falling from a horse while serving as a military surgeon. Robert Johnson, who committed suicide shortly after the Johnsons' 1869 return to Greeneville, had originally been buried in Greeneville's Mount Olivet. Several other members of the Johnson family, including grandchildren, would later be buried in the cemetery. Amongst these are his daughter Martha and her husband, former Tennessee United States Senator David T. Patterson.

When the National Park Service was given jurisdiction of the cemetery in 1942, they ruled to allow no more interments, in order to preserve the historic nature of the cemeteries. Due to efforts by the American Legion and the Daughters of the American Revolution, the cemetery once again accepted new interments, making the national cemetery one of the few controlled by the National Park Service to contain soldiers of the World Wars, Spanish–American War, Korean War, Vietnam War, and the Gulf War. Aside from Andersonville National Cemetery, it is the only National Cemetery controlled by the United States Department of the Interior to accept new burials.

The marble monument depicts the United States Constitution, an eagle, and the Bible.

See also
 List of cemeteries in Tennessee.

References

External links
 
 
 
 

Andrew Johnson
Cemeteries in Tennessee
Cemeteries on the National Register of Historic Places in Tennessee
Historic American Landscapes Survey in Tennessee
National Park Service areas in Tennessee
National Register of Historic Places in Greene County, Tennessee
Protected areas of Greene County, Tennessee
Tombs of presidents of the United States
United States national cemeteries
1906 establishments in Tennessee